A Life on Our Planet: My Witness Statement and a Vision for the Future is a 2020 book by documentarian David Attenborough and director-producer Jonnie Hughes. It follows Attenborough's career as a presenter and natural historian, along with the decline in wildlife and rising carbon emissions during the period. Attenborough warns of the effects that climate change and biodiversity loss will have in the near future, and offers action which can be taken to prevent natural disaster. A companion book to the film David Attenborough: A Life on Our Planet, it was positively received by critics.

Background
David Attenborough: A Life on Our Planet is a 2020 film by the documentarian and natural historian David Attenborough. Jonnie Hughes served as director and producer, as he has on Attenborough's documentaries since 2000. Initially scheduled for cinematic release on 16 April 2020, the film was delayed due to the COVID-19 pandemic. The film premiered on 28 September 2020 in cinemas and debuted on the online streaming platform Netflix on 4 October.

A Life on Our Planet is the companion book to the film, released on 6 October 2020. It was written by Attenborough and Hughes, who was assisted by the World Wide Fund for Nature's science team.

Synopsis 
The book opens in Pripyat, an area deserted after the Chernobyl disaster. Its first part, My Witness Statement, details key moments in Attenborough's career and the parallel decline of wildlife and rise in carbon emissions. Each chapter begins with three statistics about the period which it covers: world population, atmospheric carbon dioxide and remaining wilderness. What Lies Ahead, the second part, is about the global warming and species extinction which will continue and accelerate if human behaviour continues unchanged into the future. A Vision for the Future: How to Rewild the World, the third and final section, details measures which can be taken to avoid catastrophe and live sustainably.

As a child, Attenborough enjoyed studying fossils. His documentary career began in the 1950s when he began working for the BBC, a British public service broadcaster. He visited places such as the African Serengeti, in which native animals require vast areas of land to maintain grazing patterns. Over time, he noticed a decline in wildlife when searching for fish or orangutans or other animals which he was looking for as part of his documentaries. Areas of the Arctic or Antarctic were different to what the filming crew expected due to ice caps melting. The causes are anthropogenic climate change and biodiversity loss pushing the planet towards a sixth mass extinction event over a period of centuries rather than the hundreds of millennia that built up to previous mass extinctions.

Attenborough describes the book as his "witness statement" and gives an impression of what could happen to the planet over the course of a lifetime beginning in 2020 and lasting as long as his own, were human activity to continue unchanged. The Amazon rainforest could degrade into a savanna; the Arctic could lose all ice during summer; coral reefs could die; soil overuse could cause food crises. These irreversible events would cause mass extinction and exacerbate climate change further.

However, Attenborough describes actions which could prevent these effects and combat climate change and biodiversity loss. He proposes that bringing countries out of poverty, providing universal healthcare and improving girls' education would make the growing human population stabilise sooner and at a lower level. Renewable energy such as solar, wind, water and geothermal could sustainably power all human energy usage. Protecting a third of coastal areas from fishing could allow fish populations to thrive and the remaining area would be sufficient for human consumption. Humans changing their diet to eliminate or reduce meat in favour of plant-based foods could allow land to be used far more efficiently. Attenborough cites government intervention in Costa Rica causing deforestation to reverse, Palau's fishing regulations and improved use of land in the Netherlands as good examples.

Reception
Pilita Clark included the book on the Financial Times list of best books of 2020, under the category "Environment". Clark found that it "may not be entirely original but it is an important message from a messenger without parallel". A starred review for Kirkus Reviews praised the book as "excellent", finding Attenborough "refreshingly optimistic" and the book useful for "anyone concerned with the planet's ecological future". Bryan Appleyard of The Times found that Attenborough's "special pleading is fair and should be noted by other eco-warriors" and recommended the book both "to learn" and "to honour the man". James Bradley of The Sydney Morning Herald found the book "extremely powerful", writing that Attenborough "captures the accelerating ruination of the planet in the starkest possible terms".

References

David Attenborough
2020 non-fiction books
Books about environmentalism
Climate change books
Ebury Publishing books